Six regiments of the British Army have been numbered the 98th Regiment of Foot:

98th Regiment of Foot (1761), raised in 1761
98th Regiment of Foot (1780), raised in 1780 and disbanded in 1787
98th (Argyllshire Highlanders) Regiment of Foot, raised in 1794 and renumbered as the 91st in 1796
98th Regiment of Foot (1804), raised in 1804 and renumbered as the 97th in 1816
98th Regiment of Foot (Prince of Wales's Tipperary Regiment), raised as the 99th in 1804 and renumbered as the 98th in 1816
98th (Prince of Wales's) Regiment of Foot, raised in 1824